"Step by Step" is a song by American boyband New Kids on the Block, released on May 10, 1990 as the first single from the album of the same name (1990). It is the group's biggest-selling hit single. The lead vocals were sung by Jordan Knight. Danny Wood sang "Step 1", Donnie Wahlberg sang "Step 2", Jordan Knight sang "Step 3", Joey McIntyre sang "Step 4", and Jonathan Knight sang "Step 5".

"Step by Step" was initially recorded by one of Maurice Starr's other groups, The Superiors.  It was released as a single in 1987 on Motown Records but it was not successful. The New Kids cover of the song on the other hand was a huge worldwide hit, becoming one of the biggest selling singles of 1990. The New Kids on the Block's cover spent three weeks at No. 1 on the US Billboard Hot 100 and was eventually certified platinum; it also spent two weeks at No. 1 on the Canadian Singles Chart, in total "Step by Step" spent five weeks at No. 1 in the North American charts. It also peaked at No. 2 on the UK Singles Chart and was also a top 10 hit in the Australian, French, West German, Irish and Norwegian charts.

Critical reception
Bill Coleman from Billboard wrote, "Unstoppable teen idols preview upcoming album of the same name with a perky pop/dance confection rife with disco-era string fills. The phenomenon continues." Greg Sandow from Entertainment Weekly praised "Step by Step" as "a wonderfully ingratiating morsel of pop. It’s nourished by a chugging beat and (for dessert, so to speak) offers perky disco strings and a brief flash of silver falsetto from New Kid Jordan Knight." Ben Thompson  from NME commented, "The New Kids can be forgiven a certain caution as to where they are putting their feet, given their recent run-in with a malevolent cuddly toy. Excepting some nice Saturday Night Fever fake strings, all potential points of interest have been relentlessly expunged from this record." In their review of the album, People Magazine found that the music "is in fact better in spots than on their previous effort", noting that the song is "funkier". Rolling Stone described it as "a peppy reintroduction to the group that breaks up its generalized pledges of devotion with quick spots from each member, one-liners coyly called "ad libs" on the lyric sheet, although they're faithfully printed. (Nothing but nothing on this record happens by chance.)"

Music video
The accompanying music video for "Step by Step" was directed by American director Larry Jordan. Donnie Wahlberg's brother Mark Wahlberg also appears in the video.

Impact and legacy
"Step by Step" was voted #4 in a Smash Hits poll of "Best Boyband songs...Ever" and also made the list of the top 30 Guilty Pleasures on About.com's music site.

The song was voted #7 in a viewer poll of the greatest boy band/girl band songs on New Zealand show UChoose40. It was also voted #1 in a viewer poll of the greatest Guilty Pleasures on the same show. 

In August 2007, it was confirmed that "Step by Step" would be part of a 30-song track list in the new edition of the SingStar series titled SingStar 90s, a karaoke style game on classic '90s songs.

Furthermore, it was chosen as part of a 32-track dance game in November 2009 for the Wii, called Just Dance.

In January 2015, Heat magazine's TV Channel placed it at #17 in their "Greatest Boyband Anthems" countdown.

Track listings
 US and Canada 7-inch single
"Step by Step" - 4:27 
"Valentine Girl" - 3:57

 CD single
"Step by Step" - 4:27 
"Valentine Girl" - 3:57

Maxi-CD
"Step by Step" (Radio Edit) - 3:59 
"Step by Step" (LP Version) - 4:27 
"Step by Step" (12" Club Remix) - 5:25

Charts

Weekly charts

Year-end charts

Decade-end charts

All-time charts

Certifications and sales

References

External links
 Joey McIntyre discusses "Step By Step" - RetroRewind interview

1987 songs
1987 singles
1990 singles
New Kids on the Block songs
Billboard Hot 100 number-one singles
Cashbox number-one singles
RPM Top Singles number-one singles
Columbia Records singles
Songs written by Maurice Starr
Song recordings produced by Maurice Starr